France has had a national women's curling championship since 1971.

External links
Source

Curling competitions in France
Women's sports competitions in France